A naval ensign is an ensign (maritime flag) used by naval ships of various countries to denote their nationality. It can be the same or different from a country's civil ensign or state ensign.

It can also be known as a war ensign. A large version of a naval ensign that is flown on a warship's mast just before going into battle is called a battle ensign. An ensign differs from a jack, which is flown from a jackstaff at the bow of a vessel.

Most countries have only one national flag and ensign for all purposes. In other countries, a distinction is made between the land flag and the civil, state and naval ensigns. The British ensigns, for example, differ from the flag used on land (the Union Flag) and have different versions of plain and defaced Red and Blue ensigns for civilian and state use, as well as the naval ensign (White Ensign). Some naval ensigns differ in shape from the national flag, such as the Nordic naval ensigns, which have 'tongues'.

Countries having specific naval ensigns 
Naval ensigns that are different from the civil ensign and the national flag:

Historical naval ensigns 

Naval ensigns
Types of flags